Paraesylacris is a genus of beetles in the family Cerambycidae, containing the following species:

 Paraesylacris bituberosa Breuning, 1940
 Paraesylacris candida Martins & Galileo, 2001
 Paraesylacris columbiana Breuning, 1940

References

Apomecynini